Dame Julia Mary Walters  (born 22 February 1950), known professionally as Julie Walters, is an English actress. She is the recipient of four British Academy Television Awards, two British Academy Film Awards, two International Emmy Awards, and a Golden Globe Award. Walters has twice been nominated for an Academy Award: once for Best Actress and once for Best Supporting Actress. In 2014 she was honored with the BAFTA Fellowship. She was made a Dame (DBE) in 2017 for services to drama by Queen Elizabeth II.

Walters rose to prominence playing the title role in Educating Rita (1983), a part she originated on the West End. She has appeared in many other films, including Personal Services (1987), Prick Up Your Ears (1987), Buster (1988)  Stepping Out (1991), Sister My Sister (1994), Girls' Night (1998), Titanic Town (1998), Billy Elliot (2000), the Harry Potter series (2001–2011), Calendar Girls (2003), Becoming Jane (2007), Mamma Mia! (2008) and its 2018 sequel, Brave (2012), Paddington (2014) and its 2017 sequel, Brooklyn (2015), Film Stars Don't Die in Liverpool (2017), and Mary Poppins Returns (2018). On stage, she won an Olivier Award for Best Actress for the 2001 revival of All My Sons.

On television, Walters collaborated regularly with Victoria Wood; their projects included Wood and Walters (1981), Victoria Wood: As Seen on TV (1985–1987), Pat and Margaret (1994), and dinnerladies (1998–2000).  She has won the British Academy Television Award for Best Actress four times, more than any other performer, for her roles in My Beautiful Son (2001), Murder (2002), The Canterbury Tales (2003), and Mo (2010).  Walters and Helen Mirren are the only actresses to have won this award three consecutive times, and Walters is tied with Judi Dench for most nominations in the category with seven. For her role in A Short Stay in Switzerland (2009), she received the International Emmy Award for Best Actress. In 2006, the British public voted Walters fourth in ITV's poll of TV's 50 Greatest Stars.

Early life
Julia Mary Walters was born on 22 February 1950 at St Chad's Hospital in Edgbaston, Birmingham, England, the daughter of Mary Bridget (née O'Brien), an Irish Catholic postal clerk from County Mayo, and Thomas Walters, an English builder and decorator. According to the BBC genealogy series Who Do You Think You Are?, her maternal ancestors played an active part in the 19th-century Irish Land War. Her paternal grandfather Thomas Walters was a veteran of the Second Boer War, and was killed in action in World War I in June 1915 while serving with the 2nd Battalion of the Royal Warwickshire Regiment; he is commemorated at the Le Touret Memorial in France. Walters and her family lived at 69 Bishopton Road in the Bearwood area of Smethwick. The youngest of five children and the third to survive birth, Walters had an early education at St Paul's School for Girls in Edgbaston and later at Holly Lodge Grammar School for Girls in Smethwick. She said in 2014 that it was "heaven when [she] went to an ordinary grammar school", although she was asked to leave at the end of her lower sixth because of her "high jinks".

Walters later told interviewer Alison Oddey about her early schooling, "I was never going to be academic, so [my mother] suggested that I try teaching or nursing. [...] I'd been asked to leave school, so I thought I'd better do it." Her first job was in insurance at the age of 15. At the age of 18, she trained as a student nurse at the Queen Elizabeth Hospital in Birmingham; she worked on the ophthalmic, casualty, and coronary care wards during the 18 months she spent there. She decided to leave nursing and went on to study acting at the newly-established Manchester Polytechnic School of Theatre (now Manchester School of Theatre). She worked for the Everyman Theatre Company in Liverpool in the mid-1970s, alongside several other notable performers and writers such as Bill Nighy, Pete Postlethwaite, Jonathan Pryce, Willy Russell, and Alan Bleasdale.

Career

1971–1979: Career beginnings
Walters first received notice as the occasional partner of comedian Victoria Wood, whom she had originally met in 1971 when Wood auditioned at the School of Theatre in Manchester. The two first worked together in the 1978 theatre revue In at the Death, followed by the television adaptation of Wood's play Talent.

They went on to appear in their own Granada Television series, Wood and Walters, in 1982. They continued to perform together frequently over the years. The BAFTA-winning BBC follow-up, Victoria Wood: As Seen on TV, featured one of Walters's best-known roles, Mrs Overall, in Wood's parodic soap opera, Acorn Antiques (she later appeared in the musical version, and received an Olivier Award nomination for her efforts).

1980–1989: Educating Rita and Buster

Walters' first serious acting role on television was in Alan Bleasdale's Boys from the Blackstuff in 1982. She came to national attention when she co-starred with Michael Caine in Educating Rita (1983), a role she had created on the West End stage in Willy Russell’s 1980 play. Playing Susan "Rita" White, a Liverpudlian working-class hairdresser who seeks to better herself by signing up for and attending an Open University course in English literature, she would receive the BAFTA Award for Best Actress, the Golden Globe Award for Best Actress – Motion Picture Musical/Comedy, and a nomination for the Academy Award for Best Actress.

She performed various comic monologues in The Green Tie on the Little Yellow Dog, which was recorded 1982, and broadcast by Channel 4 in 1983.

In 1985, she played Adrian Mole's mother, Pauline, in the television adaptation of The Secret Diary of Adrian Mole. Walters appeared in the lead role of Cynthia Payne in the 1987 film Personal Services – a dramatic comedy about a British brothel owner. Then she starred with Phil Collins, playing the lead character's wife, June, in the film Buster, released in 1988. She also appeared as Mrs. Peachum in the 1989 film version of The Threepenny Opera, which was renamed Mack the Knife for the screen.

1991–1999: Solo TV show and dinnerladies
In 1991, Walters starred opposite Liza Minnelli in Stepping Out, and had a one-off television special, Julie Walters and Friends, which featured writing contributions from Victoria Wood, Alan Bennett, Willy Russell and Alan Bleasdale.

In 1993, Walters starred in the television film Wide-Eyed and Legless (known as The Wedding Gift outside the UK) alongside Jim Broadbent and Thora Hird. The film was based on the book by the author Deric Longden and tells the story of the final years of his marriage to his wife, Diana, who contracted a degenerative illness that medical officials were unable to understand at the time, though now believed to be a form of chronic fatigue syndrome or myalgic encephalomyelitis.

In 1998, she starred as the Fairy Godmother in the ITV pantomime Jack and the Beanstalk. From 1998 until 2000, she played Petula Gordeno in Victoria Wood's BBC sitcom dinnerladies. In the late 1990s, she featured in a series of adverts for Bisto gravy.

2000–2009: Harry Potter, Mamma Mia and authorship

In 2001, Walters won a Laurence Olivier Award for her performance in Arthur Miller's All My Sons. She received her second Oscar nomination and won a BAFTA for her supporting role as the ballet teacher in Billy Elliot (2000). In 2002, she again won a BAFTA Television Award for Best Actress for her performance as Paul Reiser's mother in My Beautiful Son.

Walters played Molly Weasley, the matriarch of the Weasley family, in the Harry Potter film series (2001–2011). Harry Potter and the Goblet of Fire is the only film in the series not to have included Walters. In 2003, the BBC voted her portrayal of Molly as the "second-best screen mother."

In 2003, Walters starred as a widow (Annie Clark) determined to make some good come out of her husband's death from cancer in Calendar Girls, which starred Helen Mirren. In 2005, she again starred as an inspirational real-life figure, Marie Stubbs in the ITV1 drama Ahead of the Class. In 2006, she came fourth in ITV's poll of the public's 50 Greatest Stars, coming four places above frequent co-star Victoria Wood. In 2006, she starred in the film Driving Lessons alongside Rupert Grint (who played her son Ron in Harry Potter), and had a leading role in the BBC's adaptation of Philip Pullman's novel The Ruby in the Smoke.

In summer 2006, Walters published her first novel, Maggie's Tree. The novel, concerning a group of English actors in Manhattan and published by Weidenfeld & Nicolson, was described as "a disturbing and thought-provoking novel about mental torment and the often blackly comic, mixed-up ways we view ourselves and misread each other.". Another reviewer, Susan Jeffreys, in The Independent, described the novel as "the work of a writer who knows what she's doing. There's nothing tentative about the writing, and Walters brings her experiences as an actress to bear on the page. ... you do have the sensation of entering someone else's mind and of looking through someone else's eyes." Walters starred in Asda's Christmas 2007 television advertising campaign. She also appeared alongside Patrick Stewart in UK Nintendo DS Brain Training television advertisements, and in a public information film about smoke alarms. In June 2008, Walters appeared in the film version of Mamma Mia!, playing Rosie Mulligan, marking her second high-profile musical, after Acorn Antiques: The Musical!. The same year, she released her autobiography, titled That's Another Story.

In 2007, Walters starred as the mother of author Jane Austen (played by Anne Hathaway) in Becoming Jane. Walters played Mary Whitehouse in the BBC Drama Filth: The Mary Whitehouse Story (2008), an adaptation of the real-life story of Mrs. Whitehouse who campaigned for "taste and decency on television". Walters commented, "I am very excited to be playing Mary Whitehouse, and to be looking at the time when she attacked the BBC and started to make her name." Filth won Best Motion Picture Made for Television, and Walters was nominated for Best Actress in a Miniseries or a Motion Picture Made For Television, at the 2008 13th Annual Satellite Awards.

In 2009, she received a star in the Birmingham Walk of Stars on Birmingham's Golden Mile, Broad Street. She said: "I am very honoured and happy that the people of Birmingham and the West Midlands want to include me in their Walk of Stars and I look forward to receiving my star. Birmingham and the West Midlands is where I'm from; these are my roots and in essence it has played a big part in making me the person I am today". Her other awards include an International Emmy with for A Short Stay in Switzerland.

2010–2019: The Hollow Crown, Paddington, and Indian Summer

Walters played the late MP and Secretary of State for Northern Ireland Mo Mowlam in a drama for Channel 4 broadcast in early 2010. She had misgivings about taking on the role because of the differences in their physical appearance, but the result was highly praised by critics.

In July 2012, Walters appeared in the BBC Two production The Hollow Crown as Mistress Quickly in Shakespeare's Henry IV, Parts I and II. In the summer of 2012, she voiced the Witch in Pixar's Brave (2012). In 2012, she worked with LV= to promote one of their life insurance products targeted at people over 50. Walters was seen in television advertisements, at the lv.com website and in other marketing material helping to raise awareness for life insurance.

Walters appeared in The Last of the Haussmans at the Royal National Theatre in June 2012. The production was broadcast to cinemas around the world through the National Theatre Live programme. On 18 November 2012, Walters appeared on stage at St Martin's Theatre in the West End for a 60th anniversary performance of Agatha Christie's The Mousetrap, the world's longest-running play.

In 2014, Walters portrayed Mrs. Bird, the Browns' housekeeper, in the critically acclaimed Paddington (2014). Walters reprised her role for the sequel, Paddington 2 (2017), which has also received universal acclaim.

Walters played the part of Cynthia Coffin in the ten-part British drama serial Indian Summers aired on Channel 4 in 2015. In 2015, she appeared in the romantic drama film Brooklyn, a film that was nominated for the Academy Award for Best Picture. Her performance in the film earned her a nomination for the BAFTA Award for Best Actress in a Supporting Role.

Walters voiced the Lexi Decoder (LEXI) for Channel 4 during the 2016 Paralympic Games. The graphical system aims to aid the viewing experience of the games by debunking the often confusing classifications that govern Paralympic sport. Set in London during the depression, Walters played Ellen, Michael's and Jane's long-time housekeeper, in Mary Poppins Returns (2018).

2020–present: The Secret Garden
In 2020, Walters starred with Colin Firth in The Secret Garden (2020). Also in 2020, Walters featured as the narrator for ITV documentary For the Love of Britain.

On 25 December 2021, Channel 4 aired The Abominable Snow Baby, in which Walters appeared as Granny, providing her voice for the animated television short film.

In May 2022, it was announced that Walters would star in Truelove, an upcoming drama series from Channel 4. That same month, Walters narrated the BBC documentary The Queen: 70 Glorious Years, which took a look at the Queen's life in her seventieth year on the British throne. In March 2023, she pulled out of the programme's filming due to "ill health", according to The Times, and her role was replaced by Lindsay Duncan.

Personal life
Walters' relationship with Grant Roffey, a patrol man for the AA, began in 1985 after a chance meeting in a Fulham pub, where Roffey admitted to voting Labour. He was invited to repair Walters' washing machine, a whirlwind romance ensued and the couple became parents to their only child, a daughter, who they named Maisie Mae Roffey (born 26 April 1988). The couple delayed marriage until they visited New York City in 1997. The family live on an organic farm operated by Roffey near Plaistow, West Sussex.

Walters is a lifelong supporter of West Bromwich Albion Football Club, having been brought up in Smethwick. She is a patron of the domestic violence survivors' charity Women's Aid.

Illness
Walters was diagnosed with stage III bowel cancer in 2018. Having had surgery and chemotherapy, she entered remission. This meant that she had to be cut from certain scenes in The Secret Garden and also had to miss the premiere of Mamma Mia! Here We Go Again. Walters did not announce her illness to the public until February 2020, when she said in an interview with Victoria Derbyshire that she would be taking a step back from acting, particularly from large and demanding film roles. Later that year, however, she stated that she would make an exception for roles that she was 'really engaged' with, including Mamma Mia 3!, which is currently in development.

In March 2023, Walters announced she had withdrawn from appearing in a new Channel 4 drama, Truelove, due to ill health. She was replaced in the show by Lindsay Duncan.

Filmography

Film

Television

Theatre

Bibliography
Baby Talk: The Secret Diary of a Pregnant Woman (Ebury Press, 1990)
Maggie's Tree (Weidenfeld & Nicolson, 2007)
That's Another Story: The Autobiography (Orion Books, 2009)

Honours
Walters was appointed Officer of the Order of the British Empire (OBE) in the 1999 Birthday Honours, Commander of the Order of the British Empire (CBE) in the 2008 New Year Honours, and Dame Commander of the Order of the British Empire (DBE) in the 2017 Birthday Honours for services to drama.

Awards and nominations

Walters has won eight BAFTAs, six competitive awards plus two honorary awards. The first honorary award was a special BAFTA that she received at a tribute evening in 2003, before receiving the BAFTA Fellowship in 2014.

References

External links

A Conversation with Julie Walters – interactive video interview presented by BFI Screenonline and British Telecom
Walters named as CBE

1950 births
Living people
20th-century English actresses
21st-century English actresses
Actresses awarded damehoods
Actresses from Birmingham, West Midlands
Alumni of Manchester Metropolitan University
Audiobook narrators
BAFTA fellows
Best Actress BAFTA Award winners
Best Actress BAFTA Award (television) winners
Best Musical or Comedy Actress Golden Globe (film) winners
Best Supporting Actress BAFTA Award winners
Dames Commander of the Order of the British Empire
English film actresses
English musical theatre actresses
English nurses
English people of Irish descent
English Shakespearean actresses
English stage actresses
English television actresses
English voice actresses
International Emmy Award for Best Actress winners
Laurence Olivier Award winners
People from Chichester District
People from Edgbaston
People from Smethwick
Royal Shakespeare Company members